"Adar" is the third episode of the first season of the American fantasy television series The Lord of the Rings: The Rings of Power, based on the novel The Lord of the Rings and its appendices by J. R. R. Tolkien. Set in the Second Age of Middle-earth, thousands of years before Tolkien's The Hobbit and The Lord of the Rings, it follows a large cast of characters as they face the re-emergence of evil. The episode was written by Jason Cahill and Justin Doble, and directed by Wayne Che Yip.

Amazon made a multi-season commitment for a new The Lord of the Rings series in November 2017. J. D. Payne and Patrick McKay were set to develop it in July 2018. Filming for the first season took place in New Zealand, and work on episodes beyond the first two began in January 2021. Yip was revealed to be directing four episodes of the season that March, including the third episode which introduces the island kingdom of Númenor. Production wrapped for the season in August 2021.

"Adar" premiered on the streaming service Amazon Prime Video on September 9, 2022. It was estimated to have high viewership and received generally positive reviews.

Plot 
The captured Arondir is taken to an Orc construction camp where other captives are digging trenches somewhere in the Southlands. These allow the Orcs, who are sensitive to sunlight, to move during the day. Arondir finds his fellow Elves Médhor and Revion have also been brought there, and they begin planning their escape. When Revion refuses to cut down a tree in their path, the Orcs kill Médhor. Arondir agrees to cut down the tree. He sees that the surrounding area has become poisoned and desolate.

Galadriel and Halbrand are picked up by a ship captained by Elendil who takes them to Númenor, an island kingdom ruled by Men. Relations between the island and the Elves have grown strained, and Queen Regent Míriel denies Galadriel's request for a ship back to Middle-earth. Elendil is assigned to watch over Galadriel and he takes her to the kingdom's Hall of Lore. They discover that the mark of Sauron is actually a map of the Southlands, where a new realm for evil forces is planned.

Halbrand gets into a fight with some Númenóreans and is imprisoned. Galadriel finds him and reveals that she knows he is the true king of the Southlands, descended from the Man who united the tribes of the Southland and was loyal to Morgoth. She asks him to return to Middle-earth with her to redeem both of their bloodlines. Meanwhile, Elendil's son Isildur nears the end of his training as a naval cadet, but has been encouraged by his brother Anárion to postpone his graduation against Elendil's wishes.

The evening before the Harfoots' next migration, the stranger accidentally reveals himself to the rest of the Harfoots while trying to read some star maps. The shocked Harfoots consider exiling Nori Brandyfoot for helping the stranger, but she is forgiven because of her young age. The next day, the Harfoots start migrating and the Brandyfoots struggle to keep up due to Largo, Nori's father, who has an injured ankle. The stranger follows them, and helps them with their cart.

Arondir, Revion, and some other captives attempt to escape from the Orcs when the sun is highest. The Orcs send a warg to attack them, which Arondir kills. Revion makes it out of the trench but is killed by archers. Arondir is unable to get free and is brought before the mysterious leader of the Orcs, Adar.

Production

Development 
Amazon acquired the global television rights for J. R. R. Tolkien's The Lord of the Rings in November 2017. The company's streaming service, Amazon Prime Video, gave a multi-season commitment to a series based on the novel and its appendices, to be produced by Amazon Studios. It was later titled The Lord of the Rings: The Rings of Power. Amazon hired J. D. Payne and Patrick McKay to develop the series and serve as showrunners in July 2018. Jason Cahill and Justin Doble had joined the series as writers by July 2019, and Wayne Che Yip was revealed to be directing four episodes of the first season in March 2021. The series is set in the Second Age of Middle-earth, thousands of years before the events of Tolkien's The Hobbit and The Lord of the Rings, and the first season focuses on introducing the setting and major heroic characters to the audience. Written by Cahill and Doble, and directed by Yip, the third episode is titled "Adar". This is the Elvish word for "father", and is also the name of a character who is introduced at the end of the episode.

Writing 
Doble said the episode was referred to as a second pilot for the series by the writers because so much of the Númenórean world is established in it. He felt there was a lot of exposition required before they could focus on the characters in future episodes. The showrunners wanted each group of characters to be introduced at "a time of enormous change in their worlds" to help make the series "dramatic and surprising", and for the Númenóreans this was introducing them "at a tipping point in [their] politics and culture. And [we] introduce them at the moment that Galadriel, an Elf, returns to the island and is going to set all those conflicts simmering." Executive producer Lindsey Weber elaborated that the Númenóreans "were given the island by the Elves. And half of the population or so feels very indebted and connected to Elven ways, and half or so feel that they are their own people who do things in the Númenórean way... we come to that world at its height, but at a particularly precarious moment and a moment at which something like the appearance of an Elf might have a big impact."

Casting 

The series' large cast includes Cynthia Addai-Robinson as Míriel, Maxim Baldry as Isildur, Morfydd Clark as Galadriel, Ismael Cruz Córdova as Arondir, Trystan Gravelle as Pharazôn, Lenny Henry as Sadoc Burrows, Ema Horvath as Eärien, Markella Kavenagh as Elanor "Nori" Brandyfoot, Lloyd Owen as Elendil, Megan Richards as Poppy Proudfellow, Dylan Smith as Largo Brandyfoot, Charlie Vickers as Halbrand, Daniel Weyman as the stranger, and Sara Zwangobani as Marigold Brandyfoot. Also starring are Augustus Prew as Médhor, Simon Merrells as Revion, Anthony Crum as Ontamo, Alex Tarrant as Valandil, Beau Cassidy as Dilly Brandyfoot, Thusitha Jayasundera as Malva, Maxine Cunliffe as Vilma, Joseph Mawle as Adar, Jed Brophy as Vrath, Antonio Te Maioha as sail master, Edward Clendon as Lurka, Luke Hawker as Magrot, Phil Grieve as Bazur, and Jason Hood as Tamar.

Filming 
Amazon confirmed in September 2019 that filming for the first season would take place in New Zealand, where the Lord of the Rings and Hobbit film trilogies were made. Filming primarily took place at Kumeu Film Studios and Auckland Film Studios in Auckland, under the working title Untitled Amazon Project or simply UAP. Production on episodes beyond the first two began in January 2021, and Yip confirmed that he had begun filming his episodes by March. Filming for the season wrapped on August 2. For the introduction to Númenór, Yip felt going straight to a wide establishing shot would be overwhelming for the audience and stop them from seeing all the details of the city, so he constructed the sequence so that it would reveal parts of the city first before expanding to wider shots once the ship reaches the harbor.

Visual effects 
Visual effects for the episode were created by Industrial Light & Magic (ILM), Wētā FX, Method Studios, Rodeo FX, Cause and FX, Atomic Arts, and Cantina Creative. The different vendors were overseen by visual effects supervisor Jason Smith. The establishing shots of Númenór in the episode came after a long development period with production designer Ramsey Avery, and Payne said seeing the completed visual effects was when he felt they had reached "the thing we've been trying to get to". The visual effects team used aerial photography of different European cities as reference for these shots.

When approaching the warg that attacks Arondir, Smith did not want to copy the wargs that had previously been seen in the films. He asked the question, "What would an orc's pet giant dog monster be?", and after various designs and researching footage of real dogs he settled on the idea of scaling up the "pure hate" of a chihuahua into "800 pounds of mostly muscle". He felt the familiarity that came with this made the creature even more horrific. Wētā created the warg, and used footage of different carnivorous animals as reference for animating its movements. Smith said this added a realistic messiness and element of surprise to the sequence.

Music 

A soundtrack album featuring composer Bear McCreary's score for the episode was released on Amazon Music on September 9, 2022. McCreary said the album contained "virtually every second of score" from the episode. It was added to other music streaming services after the full first season was released. All music composed by Bear McCreary:

Release 
"Adar" premiered on Prime Video in the United States on September 9, 2022. It was released at the same time around the world, in more than 240 countries and territories.

Reception

Viewership 
Software company Whip Media, who track viewership data for the 21 million worldwide users of their TV Time app, calculated that for the week ending September 11, two days after the episode's debut, The Rings of Power was the third-highest original streaming series for U.S. viewership behind Netflix's Cobra Kai and Disney+'s She-Hulk: Attorney at Law. JustWatch, a guide to streaming content with access to data from more than 20 million users around the world, placed it second on their list of top 10 streaming series in the U.S. for the week ending September 11, after Adult Swim's Rick and Morty. Nielsen Media Research, who record streaming viewership on U.S. television screens, estimated that the series was watched for 1.2 billion minutes during the week ending September 11. This was on par with viewership from the previous week, but the series dropped from first to fourth-place on the company's list of top streaming series and films. Parrot Analytics determines audience "demand expressions" based on various data sources, including social media activity and comments on rating platforms. During the week ending September 16, the company calculated that The Rings of Power was 30 times more in demand than the average U.S. streaming series, placing it eighth on the company's top 10 list for the week.

Critical response 

The review aggregator website Rotten Tomatoes reported an 85% approval rating with an average score of 7.3/10 based on 34 reviews. The website's critics consensus reads: "The Rings of Power risks straining viewers' patience by expanding its scope instead of meaningfully progressing its established story threads, but 'Adar' is just as impressive as its predecessors."

Accolades 
Ismael Cruz Córdova was named an honorable mention for TVLine "Performer of the Week" for the week of September 5, 2022, for his performance in this episode. The site highlighted Arondir's fight against the warg, specifically "the fire in Ismael Cruz Córdova's eyes and the mighty roar from his lungs as the Elf fought back... Arondir is quickly becoming one of our favorites to watch." Production designer Ramsey Avery won the award for Excellence in Production Design for a One-Hour Period or Fantasy Single-Camera Series at the 2022 Art Directors Guild Awards for his work on this episode. The episode also won the award for Outstanding Created Environment in an Episode, Commercial, or Real-Time Project at the 21st Visual Effects Society Awards for Númenor City (attributed to Dan Wheaton, Nico Delbecq, Dan LeTarte, Julien Gauthier).

Companion media 
An episode of the official aftershow Deadline's Inside the Ring: LOTR: The Rings of Power for "Adar" was released on September 10, 2022. Hosted by Deadline Hollywood Dominic Patten and Anthony D'Alessandro, it features exclusive "footage and insights" for the episode, plus interviews with cast members Owen, Clark, Vickers, Addai-Robinson, Gravelle, Kavenagh, Richards, Weyman, and Zwangobani, as well as Yip, Doble, and McCreary. On October 14, The Official The Lord of the Rings: The Rings of Power Podcast was released on Amazon Music. Hosted by actress Felicia Day, the third episode is dedicated to "Adar" and features Vickers, Payne, and McKay. On November 21, a bonus segment featuring behind-the-scenes footage from the episode was added to Prime Video's X-Ray feature as part of a series titled "The Making of The Rings of Power".

References

External links 
 

2022 American television episodes
The Lord of the Rings: The Rings of Power